Daotanghe (Mandarin: 倒淌河镇) is a town in Gonghe County, Hainan Tibetan Autonomous Prefecture, Qinghai, China. In 2010, Daotanghe had a total population of 10,437: 5,455 males and 4,982 females: 2,678 aged under 14, 7,257 aged between 15 and 65 and 502 aged over 65.

References 

Township-level divisions of Qinghai
Hainan Tibetan Autonomous Prefecture